The  is a Japanese company that produces a range of musical instruments.

History
Suzuki was founded in 1953 by Mr. Manji Suzuki. Initially the company manufactured Harmonicas and later developed the Melodion which in 1956 was officially adopted  by the Japanese Ministry of Education for use in schools.
Authorised Distribution centers are located in the United Kingdom (Suzuki Europe Ltd - owned by Suzuki Japan) and in Western U.S. (distribution center is located in San Diego, California).
It has expanded to include a variety of instruments including pianos and band instruments, and purely electronic instruments such as the Tronichord, Omnichord, and QChord Digital Soundcard Guitar.

In 1991 Suzuki bought the Hammond Organ Co., which is now known as Hammond Suzuki.

References

External links

 

 Interview with President, Fujio Suzuki NAMM Oral History Library (2003)
 Interview with Chairman, Manji Suzuki NAMM Oral History Library (2006)

Electronic organ manufacturing companies
Harmonica manufacturers
Audio amplifier manufacturers
Manufacturing companies established in 1953
Japanese brands
Musical instrument manufacturing companies of Japan
Japanese companies established in 1953